Adolf Scherwitzl (born 27 June 1938) is an Austrian biathlete. He competed at the 1964 Winter Olympics and the 1968 Winter Olympics.

References

External links
 

1938 births
Living people
Austrian male biathletes
Olympic biathletes of Austria
Biathletes at the 1964 Winter Olympics
Biathletes at the 1968 Winter Olympics
People from Villach-Land
Sportspeople from Carinthia (state)